In ancient Greek religion, Nemesis, also called Rhamnousia or Rhamnusia, was the goddess who personifies retribution for the sin of hubris: arrogance before the gods.

Etymology
The name Nemesis is related to the Greek word νέμειν némein, meaning "to give what is due", from Proto-Indo-European *nem- "distribute".

Family 
Nemesis has been described as the daughter of Oceanus, Erebus, or Zeus, but according to Hyginus she was a child of Erebus and Nyx. She has also been described, by Hesiod, as the daughter of Nyx alone. In the Theogony, Nemesis is the sister of the Moirai (the Fates), the Keres (Black Fates), the Oneiroi (Dreams), Eris (Discord) and Apate (Deception). Some made her the daughter of Zeus by an unnamed mother. In several traditions, Nemesis was seen as the mother of Helen of Troy by Zeus, adopted and raised by Leda and Tyndareus. According to the poet Bacchylides, she was the mother of the Telchines by Tartarus.

Mythology

Fortune and retribution 

The word nemesis originally meant the distributor of fortune, neither good nor bad, simply in due proportion to each according to what was deserved. Later, Nemesis came to suggest the resentment caused by any disturbance of this right proportion, the sense of justice that could not allow it to pass unpunished.

O. Gruppe (1906) and others connect the name with "to feel just resentment". From the fourth century onward, Nemesis, as the just balancer of Fortune's chance, could be associated with Tyche.

Divine retribution is a major theme in the Greek world view, providing the unifying theme of the tragedies of Sophocles and many other literary works. Hesiod states: "Also deadly Nyx bore Nemesis an affliction to mortals subject to death" (Theogony, 223, though perhaps an interpolated line). Nemesis appears in a still more concrete form in a fragment of the epic Cypria.

She is implacable justice: that of Zeus in the Olympian scheme of things, although it is clear she existed prior to him, as her images look similar to several other goddesses, such as Cybele, Rhea, Demeter, and Artemis.

In the Greek tragedies Nemesis appears chiefly as the avenger of crime and the punisher of hubris, and as such is akin to Atë and the Erinyes. She was sometimes called Adrasteia, probably meaning "one from whom there is no escape"; her epithet Erinys ("implacable") is specially applied to Demeter and the Phrygian mother goddess, Cybele.

Nemesis and Zeus 
In some traditions, Nemesis is the mother of Helen of Troy, rather than the mortal queen Leda. This narrative is first found in the lost epic Cypria, the prelude of the Iliad. According to its author, Stasinus of Cyprus, Helen was born from the rape of Nemesis by Zeus. Zeus fell in love with Nemesis, here presented as his daughter, and pursued her, only for her to flee in shame. She took several forms to escape Zeus, but he eventually captured her. Pseudo-Apollodorus speaks of a single transformation, into a goose, while Zeus turned into a swan to hunt her down and raped her, producing an egg that was given to the queen of Sparta; Helen hatched from the egg, and was raised by Leda. In another variation, Zeus desired Nemesis, but could not persuade her to sleep with him. So he tasked Aphrodite to transform into an eagle and mock-chase him, while he transformed into a swan. Nemesis, pitying the poor swan, offered it refuge in her arms, and fell into a deep sleep. While asleep, Zeus raped her and in time she bore an egg which was transported to Leda by Hermes. According to Eratosthenes in his Catasterismi, this version was presented by Cratinus.

Narcissus 
Nemesis enacted divine retribution on Narcissus for his vanity. After he rejected the advances of the nymph Echo, Nemesis lured him to a pool where he caught sight of his own reflection and fell in love with it, eventually dying.

Aura 
In Nonnus' epic Dionysiaca, Aura, one of Artemis' virgin attendants, questioned her mistress' virginity due to the feminine and curvaceous shape of her body; Aura claimed that no goddess or woman with that sort of figure would be a virgin, and asserted her own superiority over the goddess thanks to her own lean and boyish silhouette. Artemis, enraged, went to Nemesis and asked for revenge. Nemesis promised to the goddess that Aura would have her punishment, and that the punishment would be to lose the virginity she took such pride in. Nemesis then contacted Eros, the god of love, and he struck Dionysus with one of his arrows. Dionysus fell madly in love with Aura, and when she rebuffed his advances, he got her drunk, tied her up and raped her as she lay unconscious, bringing Nemesis' plan to a success.

Iconography
She is portrayed as a winged goddess wielding a whip or a dagger. In early times the representations of Nemesis resembled Aphrodite, who sometimes bears the epithet Nemesis.

As the goddess of proportion and the avenger of crime, she has as attributes a measuring rod (tally stick), a bridle, scales, a sword, and a scourge, and she rides in a chariot drawn by griffins.

The poet Mesomedes wrote a hymn to Nemesis in the early second century AD, where he addressed her:
Nemesis, winged balancer of life, dark-faced goddess, daughter of Justice
and mentioned her "adamantine bridles" that restrain "the frivolous insolences of mortals".

Local cult
A festival called Nemeseia (by some identified with the Genesia) was held at Athens. Its object was to avert the nemesis of the dead, who were supposed to have the power of punishing the living, if their cult had been in any way neglected (Sophocles, Electra, 792; E. Rohde, Psyche, 1907, i. 236, note I).

Rhamnous
As the "Goddess of Rhamnous", Nemesis was honored and placated in an archaic sanctuary in the district of Rhamnous, in northeastern Attica. There she was a daughter of Oceanus, the primeval river-ocean that encircles the world. Pausanias noted her iconic statue there. It included a crown of stags and little Nikes and was made by Pheidias after the Battle of Marathon (490 BC), crafted from a block of Parian marble brought by the overconfident Persians, who had intended to make a memorial stele after their expected victory.

Smyrna
At Smyrna, there were two manifestations of Nemesis, more akin to Aphrodite than to Artemis. The reason for this duality is hard to explain. It is suggested that they represent two aspects of the goddess, the kindly and the implacable, or the goddesses of the old city and the new city refounded by Alexander. The martyrology Acts of Pionius, set in the "Decian persecution" of AD 250–51, mentions a lapsed Smyrnan Christian who was attending to the sacrifices at the altar of the temple of these Nemeses.

Rome

Nemesis was one of several tutelary deities of the drill-ground (as Nemesis campestris). Modern scholarship offers little support for the once-prevalent notion that arena personnel such as gladiators, venatores and bestiarii were personally or professionally dedicated to her cult. Rather, she seems to have represented a kind of "Imperial Fortuna" who dispensed Imperial retribution on the one hand, and Imperially subsidized gifts on the other; both were functions of the popular gladiatorial Ludi held in Roman arenas. She is shown on a few examples of Imperial coinage as Nemesis-Pax, mainly under Claudius and Hadrian. In the third century AD, there is evidence of the belief in an all-powerful Nemesis-Fortuna. She was worshipped by a society called Hadrian's freedmen.

Ammianus Marcellinus includes her in a digression on Justice following his description of the death of Gallus Caesar.

See also 

 (Goddesses of Justice): Astraea, Dike, Themis, Prudentia
 (Goddesses of Injustice): Adikia
 (Aspects of Justice):  (see also: Triple deity/Triple Goddess (neopaganism))
 (Justice) Themis/Dike/Justitia (Lady Justice), Raguel (the Angel of Justice)
 (Retribution) Nemesis/Rhamnousia/Rhamnusia/Adrasteia/Invidia
 (Redemption) Eleos/Soteria/Clementia, Zadkiel/Zerachiel (the Angel of Mercy)
 Sekhmet
 Kali

Notes

References

Bibliography 
 Hesiod, The Homeric Hymns, and Homerica, with an English Translation by Hugh G. Evelyn-White, Cambridge, MA., Harvard University Press; London, William Heinemann Ltd. 1914. Online version at the Perseus Digital Library. 
 
 Pausanias, Pausanias Description of Greece with an English Translation by W.H.S. Jones, Litt.D., and H.A. Ormerod, M.A., in 4 Volumes.'' Cambridge, Massachusetts, Harvard University Press; London, William Heinemann Ltd. 1918. Online version at the Perseus Digital Library.

External links 
 
 GreekMythology.com – Nemesis
 Important Facts on Nemesis in Greek Mythology
 NEMESIS from The Theoi Project

Justice goddesses
Vengeance goddesses
Greek goddesses
Personifications in Greek mythology
Oceanids
Divine women of Zeus
Children of Zeus
Children of Nyx
Metamorphoses characters
Mythological rape victims
Avian humanoids
Shapeshifters in Greek mythology